Gilbert "Gil" Paul Filar (born June 8, 1986) is a Canadian actor. He is known for his voicing Fox on the first three seasons of Franklin and for portraying Boobull Goblin on The Noddy Shop. He is also the younger brother of Maia Filar, who voiced Phoebe Terese in The Magic School Bus.

In 2007, he co-founded PistolPress in Montreal with fellow Concordia University graduates.

As a graduate student at the University of Montana, Filar published articles in Glimmer Train.

Filmography

Film

Television

References

External links
 

1986 births
Canadian magicians
Canadian male voice actors
Canadian male short story writers
Male actors from Toronto
Living people
21st-century Canadian short story writers
21st-century Canadian male writers
Concordia University alumni
University of Montana alumni
Writers from Toronto

pl:Gil Filar
vo:Gil Filar
de:Gil Filar